Highway 104 in Nova Scotia, Canada, runs from Fort Lawrence at the New Brunswick border near Amherst to River Tillard near St. Peter's. Except for the portion on Cape Breton Island between Port Hawkesbury and St. Peter's, it forms the main route of the Trans-Canada Highway across the province.

Highway 104 mostly supplants the former route of Trunk 4. In 1970, all sections of Trunk 4 west of New Glasgow were renumbered, although the number was added back in the Mount Thom and Wentworth Valley areas in the 1990s when new alignments of Highway 104 opened to traffic.

The provincial government named the highway the Miners Memorial Highway on 8 September 2008 one month before the 50th anniversary of the Springhill mining disaster of 23 October 1958.

Route description

The eastern  from Sutherlands River to River Tillard is a mixture of 2-lane controlled access freeway known as a Super 2, uncontrolled access 2-lane highway, and 4-lane divided freeway sections.

Highway 104 is divided into two distinct sections; the Trans-Canada Highway section which runs from the New Brunswick border to Port Hastings, and a smaller section on Cape Breton Island between Port Hawkesbury and St. Peter's.

Trans Canada Highway 
This section had been built in the 1960s as a Super 2 and was upgraded to a 4-lane divided freeway that opened in 1993.

The highway continues to Sutherlands River, were it reaches the eastern extent of the end of the 4-lane divided freeway.

Prior to this new alignment opening, Highway 104 ran east on the present alignment of Trunk 4 and Post Road in the town of Antigonish and included three intersections controlled by traffic lights. Prior to this new alignment opening, this section was an uncontrolled access highway (formerly Trunk 4).

It crosses the Strait of Canso along the  Canso Causeway to Port Hastings on Cape Breton Island. At Port Hastings, the highway intersects Trunk 4, Trunk 19 and Highway 105 at a roundabout where Highway 105 proceeds east carrying the Trans-Canada Highway designation.

Cape Breton Island 
From the roundabout at Port Hastings, there is an  gap in Highway 104 which is connected by Trunk 4, passing the town of Port Hawkesbury. The highway reappears at the Exit 43 interchange for Trunk 4 in Melville, just outside of Port Hawkesbury.  A Highway 104 bypass from Port Hastings to Melville has been proposed in the past.  Concept designs have shown a new alignment of 4-lane freeway being built around the northwest side of Port Hastings, crossing Highway 105 at a new interchange near an electrical substation.  The new alignment of Highway 104 would proceed east and then southeast approximately following a power line corridor to the Exit 43 interchange in Melville.

An extension of Highway 104 from River Tillard to Sydney River has been proposed in the past. The Nova Scotia provincial government has designated the entire length of Highway 104 from Fort Lawrence to River Tillard as a "strategic highway" to qualify for federal cost-sharing of maintenance and future upgrades. This designation has also been applied to the remaining Trunk 4 corridor in Cape Breton along the south shore of Bras d'Or Lake from St. Peters to Sydney River. It is eventually envisioned that the Trans-Canada Highway will follow the entire length of Highway 104 from Amherst to Sydney River as a 4-lane freeway, upgraded from the existing two-lane freeway and uncontrolled access sections of the highway.

History 
Highway 104 was upgraded in various stages as follows:

 KM 0 to 49, section from the New Brunswick border to Thomson Station had been built in the 1960s as a Super 2 and was upgraded to a 4-lane divided freeway in 1993.
KM 49 to 92, section from Thomson Station to Masstown had been built as a 4-lane divided freeway that opened November 15, 1997; tolled section known as Cobequid Pass.
KM 92 to 146, section from Masstown to Salt Springs had been built in the 1960s as a Super 2 and was upgraded to a 4-lane divided freeway that opened in the early 1990s.
 KM 146 to 159, section from Salt Springs to Westville Road was built as a new alignment of 4-lane divided freeway that opened in the late 1990s.  Prior to this new alignment opening, Highway 104 ran east on the present alignment of Trunk 4.
 KM 159 to 166, section from Westville Road to Plymouth had been built in the 1960s as a Super 2 and was upgraded to a 4-lane divided freeway that opened in the early 1990s.
 KM 166 to 174, section from Plymouth to Pine Tree had been built in the 1960s as a Super 2 and was upgraded to a 4-lane divided freeway that opened in fall 2011.
 KM 174 to 177, section from Pine Tree to Sutherlands River had been built in the 1960s as an uncontrolled access highway (formerly Trunk 4) and was upgraded to a 4-lane divided freeway that opened in fall 2012.
KM 177 to 219, section from Sutherlands River to Addington Forks had been built in the 1960s as a Super 2. It is in the process of being upgraded to a 4-lane divided freeway.
KM 219 to 228, section from Addington Forks to South River Road, built in the 2010s as a 4-lane divided freeway that opened September 19, 2012.
KM 228 to 235, section from South River Road to Dagger Woods, built in the 2010s as a 4-lane divided freeway that opened October 22, 2016.
KM 235 to 236, section from Dagger Woods to Pomquet Forks had been built in the 1960s as a Super 2.
KM 236 to 239, section from Pomquet Forks to Heatherton had been built in the 1950s; originally part of Trunk 4.
KM 239 to 269, section from Heatherton to Aulds Cove had been built from 1965-1969 as a Super 2.
KM 269 to 274, section from Auld's Cove to Port Hastings had been built and upgraded in the 1950s and 1960s, with the Canso Causeway opening in 1955.
KM 282 to 319, section from Port Hawkesbury to River Tillard has been built in the 1970s as a Super 2.

Future 
The Province of Nova Scotia awarded the P3 contract that will twin a  section of Highway 104 between Sutherlands River and Antigonish to Dexter Nova Alliance. As part the project, there will be  of existing highway upgraded and a  new, realigned section; the bypassed section of Highway 104 between Barney's River Station and Marshy Hope would revert to being part of Trunk 4.  Construction began in the spring of 2020, with a completion date of no later than the end of 2023.

The province of Nova Scotia has proposed construction of a new 84-kilometre (52 mi) 2 lane arterial from the current end of Highway 104 at St. Peter's to Highway 125 at Sydney. This highway would travel mostly east of the current Trunk 4 and open as a Super 2. It would serve as a bypass of Trunk 4 and likely take designation of the Trans Canada Highway rather than Highway 105. When completed, this would provide nearly continuous controlled access highway across Nova Scotia on the Trans Canada Highway. Construction costs are estimated to be approximately $500 million and tolls have been proposed in the past. This project is currently not on the province's 5-year highway plan.

Exit list

References

104
Nova Scotia 104
Limited-access roads in Canada
104
104
104
104
104
104
104
Antigonish, Nova Scotia
Transport in New Glasgow, Nova Scotia